Italian Navy may refer to:
 Pre-unitarian navies of the Italian states
 Regia Marina, the Royal Navy of the Kingdom of Italy (1861–1946)
 Italian Navy (Marina Militare), the navy of the Italian Republic (1946–today)